Aluminium monofluoride, also known as fluoridoaluminium, is the chemical compound with the formula AlF.  This elusive species is formed by the reaction between aluminium trifluoride and metallic aluminium at elevated temperatures but quickly reverts to the reactants when cooled.  Clusters derived from related aluminium(I) halides can be stabilized using specialized ligands.

This molecule has been detected in the interstellar medium, where molecules are so dilute that intermolecular collisions are unimportant.

See also
Aluminium monobromide
Aluminium monochloride
Aluminium monoiodide

References

Aluminium(I) compounds
Fluorides
Metal halides